The 1994 Pacific Cup was the seventh staging of the Pacific Cup. It is a rugby league tournament held between Pacific teams. The tournament was hosted by Fiji and eventually won by Tonga, who defeated the hosts 34 - 11 in the final.

Squads
Before the tournament began both Papua New Guinea and Tokelau pulled out due to lack of funds.
The New Zealand Māori squad was coached by John Solomon and included Blair Harding, Alex Chan, Tane Manihera, Leroy Joe, Mark Woods and Darren Rameka. 
Tonga were coached by Graham Mattson and included Jim Dymock, John Hopoate, Albert Fulivai, Willie Wolfgramm, Franklin Fonua, Greg Wolfgramm and Matt Roiall, .
Richie Barnett, Whetu Taewa, Logan Edwards, Jason Palmada, Willie Poching, Tony Tatupu and Tevita Vaikona were all unavailable for the tournament.

Results

Pool A

Group B

Finals

Semi-finals

Third place playoff

Final

References

Pacific Cup
Rugby league in Fiji
Pacific Cup
Pacific Cup
Pacific Cup